Some animals are capable of changing their colors with varying degrees of transformation. This may be a very gradual (shedding of fur or feathers) seasonal camouflage, occurring only twice a year. In other animals more rapid changes may be a form of active camouflage, or of signalling.

Examples
Examples of animals that change color include:

Mammals and birds
 Alaskan hare - In the summer, Alaskan hares have a brown fur coat with white under parts. In the winter, they have a white fur coat with black-tipped ears. They also shed their gray-brown summer topcoat, becoming all white during the winter.
 Arctic hare - In Newfoundland and southern Labrador, the Arctic hare changes its coat color, moulting and growing new fur, from brown or grey in the summer to white in the winter, like some other Arctic animals including ermine and ptarmigan, enabling it to remain camouflaged as the environment changes. However, the Arctic hares in the far north of Canada, where summer is very short, remain white all year round.
 Arctic fox
 Rock ptarmigan
 Willow ptarmigan
 Snowshoe hare
 Stoat
 Long-tailed duck

Reptiles and amphibians
 Chameleons - Colour change signals a chameleon's physiological condition and intentions to other chameleons. Because chameleons are ectothermic, they change color also to regulate their body temperatures, either to a darker color to absorb light and heat to raise their temperature, or to a lighter color to reflect light and heat, thereby either stabilizing or lowering their body temperature.
 Anoles - The majority of anoles (Dactyloidae) can change their color depending on things like emotions (for example, aggression or stress), activity level, levels of light and as a social signal (for example, displaying dominance).
 Frogs, e.g. gray treefrog and Peron's tree frog (which can change colour in less than one hour).

Molluscs
 Cephalopod - Cephalopods can change their colors and patterns in milliseconds, whether for signalling (both within the species and for warning) or active camouflage, as their chromatophores are expanded or contracted. Although color changes appear to rely primarily on vision input, there is evidence that skin cells, specifically chromatophores, can detect light and adjust to light conditions independently of the eyes.
 Cuttlefish including Sepia prashadi
 Octopus including mimic octopus and giant Pacific octopus

Fish
 Many fish change colors, including several species of gobies and groupers. Color changes may be initiated by changes in mood, temperature, and stress in addition to visible changes in the local environment.
 Flounder e.g. Hippoglossina oblonga
 Syngnathidae (including seahorses)

Insects and spiders
 Charidotella sexpunctata - Adults can turn from shiny gold through reddish-brown when disturbed.
 Misumena vatia - The color change from white to yellow (depending on the color of the flowers on which the spider is hunting) takes between 10 and 25 days; the reverse about six days. 
 Chrysso venusta has been observed to rapidly change its color when disturbed.
 Some spiders, including Cyrtophora cicatrosa, can change colour rapidly.
 Thomisus spectabilis

See also
 Bioluminescence
 Peppered moth evolution -  an example of colour change during evolution

References

color change
animals